Stephanie or Estefania (died after 1066) was the  Queen consort of Navarre by marriage to García Sánchez III of Navarre. Early chroniclers are in conflict over her parentage.

Origins

Parentage
Stephanie was born at an unknown date, and is first recorded as wife of García in a document dated 1038/40. There are two theories concerning Stephanie's parentage. The first is that she was the daughter of Berenguer Ramon I, Count of Barcelona. Another theory is Stephanie was the daughter of Bernard-Roger, Count of Bigorre and his wife Garsenda.

Possible first marriage
There are other hints, besides the dubious account of the Chronicle of Saint-Pierre-le-Vif, to an earlier marriage by Stephanie.  Histoire Générale de Languedoc, giving no quote or source reference, reports the existence of a 1036 marriage contract attributed to Stephanie.  An episode related in the Chronica Naierensis tells that a daughter of queen Stephanie by a prior husband was promised as wife to Sancho II of Castile, but she was abducted and married by an illegitimate son of García.  Jaime de Salazar y Acha suggests that this represents the authentic account of the marriage of García's bastard son, Sancho Garcés, Lord of Uncastillo, to his wife Constanza, though traditional accounts give her different parentage.  He recognizes the problem with identifying the father with Roger I of Tosny and follows an alternative reconstruction that would make the Iberian crusader a distinct Roger de Tosny, nephew of Roger I.

Issue
Stephanie had the following children by García:
Sancho IV "El de Peñalén", king of Navarre, married Placencia
Ramiro (d.1083), lord of Calahorra
Ferdinand Garcés, lord of Bucesta
Raymond Garcés "the Fratricide" (Ramón el Fratricida), lord of Murillo and Cameros
Ermesinda Garcés, married Fortún Sánchez de Yarnoz
Mayor Garcés
Urraca Garcés (d.1108), married Castilian count García Ordóñez
Jimena

She may also have been mother by an earlier marriage, perhaps to Roger Ι of Tosny, of:
Constanza, wife of Sancho Garcés, Lord of Uncastillo

References

Sources

Navarrese royal consorts
Burials at the Monastery of Santa María la Real of Nájera
11th-century Spanish women
11th-century people from the Kingdom of Pamplona
Queen mothers